Beggiatoa leptomitoformis  is a chemolithoautotrophic bacterium from the genus of Beggiatoa which has been isolated from wastewater from Moscow in Russia.

References

External links
Type strain of Beggiatoa leptomitoformis at BacDive -  the Bacterial Diversity Metadatabase

 

Thiotrichales
Bacteria described in 2017